Battle of Beijing may refer to multiple battles fought in what is now Beijing:
 Battle of Gaoliang River (979), between the Liao and Song dynasties
 Battle of Zhongdu (1215), between the Mongols and the Jurchen Jin dynasty
 Battle of Dadu (1368), Ming dynasty army captured Yuan capital Dadu 
 Defense of Beijing (1449), Ming dynasty successfully defended invasion again Oirat Mongols
 Battle of Beijing (1644), between the Ming dynasty and rebel Li Zicheng
 1860, during the Second Opium War
 1865, during the Nian Rebellion
 Battle of Peking (1900), during the Boxer Rebellion
 1920, during the Zhili–Anhui War
 1922, during the First Zhili–Fengtian War
 1928, during the Second Chinese Revolutionary War, part of the Chinese Civil War
 Battle of Beiping–Tianjin (1937), during the Second Sino-Japanese War
 Pingjin Campaign (1948–1949), during the Third Chinese Revolutionary War

See also
 History of Beijing

Battles involving China